Aluch (also Romanized as Ālūch; also known as Ālūj) is a village in Meshgin-e Gharbi Rural District, in the Central District of Meshgin Shahr County, Ardabil Province, Iran. At the 2006 census, its population was 469, in 102 families.

References 

Towns and villages in Meshgin Shahr County